Magdalena Neff (1881–1966), was a German pharmacist.  She is known as the first formally educated female pharmacist, which she became in 1906.

References

1881 births
1966 deaths
German pharmacists
Women pharmacists